Mehsana Airport is a civil aviation training base in Mehsana, Gujarat, India. It is used for non-scheduled operations.

An abandoned airfield was developed by the Government of Gujarat and a private company, Ahmedabad Aviation and Aeronautics Ltd (AAA Ltd) on a public-private partnership basis in 2007, the first such partnership in Gujarat. The 64 acre airport was developed with the help of the Indian Air Force and DGCA and was inaugurated by the Chief Minister of Gujarat, Narendra Modi. AAA Ltd used the Sardar Vallabhbhai Patel International Airport in Ahmedabad prior to shifting its training activities to Mehsana Airport in 2007.

The airport was at the centre of a dispute between its owners and the Mehsana Municipality, which closed access the facility twice in 2010 due to non-payment of taxes. However, AAA Ltd contended that it is not liable to pay the taxes stated. The facility was reopened after the Gujarat High Court ordered the same.

See also 

 List of airports in Gujarat

References

External links
 Ahmedabad Aviation and Aeronautics Ltd. website

Airports in Gujarat
Transport in Mehsana
Airports established in 2007
2007 establishments in Gujarat